Ján Hucko (11 May 1932 – 20 November 2020) was a Slovak football player and coach. He coached for FC Spartak Trnava and ŠK Slovan Bratislava.

References

1932 births
2020 deaths
People from Dolný Kubín
Sportspeople from the Žilina Region
Czechoslovak footballers
Slovak footballers
Association football midfielders
Czechoslovak football managers
Slovak football managers
ŠK Slovan Bratislava managers
FC Spartak Trnava managers
Zamalek SC managers